Lionel Seymour William Dawson-Damer, 4th Earl of Portarlington (7 April 1832 – 17 December 1892), known as Lionel Dawson-Damer until 1889, was a British peer and Conservative politician.

Background 
Portarlington was the only son of the Hon. George Dawson-Damer, younger son of John Dawson, 1st Earl of Portarlington. His mother was Mary Georgiana Emma, daughter of Lord Hugh Seymour. According to a private letter between Louisa & Eddy Eliot, dated 27 Sep 1841, their brother's friend "Seymour Damer is gone to school in Liverpool".

Political career 
Portarlington was returned to Parliament for the Portarlington constituency in 1857, a seat he held until 1865 and again between 1868 and 1880. In 1889 he succeeded his cousin as fourth Earl of Portarlington. However, as this was an Irish peerage he was not allowed to take a seat in the House of Lords.

He was promoted from cornet to lieutenant in the Dorsetshire Yeomanry on 20 April 1858.

Family 
Lord Portarlington married the Honourable Harriett Lydia, eldest daughter and co-heiress of Henry Montagu, 6th Baron Rokeby, on 19 Apr 1855. They had several children. He died on 17 Dec 1892, aged 60, and was succeeded in the earldom by his eldest son, Lionel. Lady Portarlington died in November 1894.

References

External links 
 

1832 births
1892 deaths
Members of the Parliament of the United Kingdom for Portarlington
UK MPs 1857–1859
UK MPs 1859–1865
UK MPs 1868–1874
UK MPs 1874–1880
UK MPs who inherited peerages
Queen's Own Dorset Yeomanry officers
Irish Conservative Party MPs
Earls of Portarlington
Dawson-Damer family